OK is Chang Chen-yue's ninth studio album. It was released in 2007.

Track listing

Note : The album does not provide English titles; the titles are approximate translations.

2007 albums
Chang Chen-yue albums